Carry the Wounded is an extended play by the American Christian metal band Tourniquet. It was released on Intense Records in 1995. The EP is more mellow than the band's studio albums. It contains three new songs, a cover of the 1969 single "Oh Well" by Fleetwood Mac, and a new version of "My Promise" from Tourniquet's 1994 album Vanishing Lessons.

Track listing 

 appears on The Collected Works of Tourniquet (1996)
 acoustic version appears on Acoustic Archives (1998)

Personnel

Tourniquet
Ted Kirkpatrick - drums, percussion, guitar, background vocals
Gary Lenaire - guitar
Victor Macias - bass guitar
Luke Easter - vocals, background vocals
Aaron Guerra - guitar

Additional musicians
Jim Cox - piano/keys ("When the Love is Right")
Paul McIntire - violin ("My Promise")
Rick Rekedal - cello ("My Promise")

Additional personnel
Produced by Jim Faraci
Engineered by Jim Faraci
Second engineer: Steve Good
Mixed by Jim Faraci and Charlie Brocco
Mastered by Chris Bellman at Bernie Grundman's
A&R: Matthew Duffy
Photography: David Dobson
Art direction: Thom Roy/Matthew Duffy
Composites and design: Jack Wedell and Megan Giles

References

External links
Carry the Wounded at Tourniquet.net

1995 EPs
Tourniquet (band) albums